Ocampo is a surname of Galician origin. It derives from a common Galician toponym meaning 'the field', from the Galician definite article o (masculine singular) + campo 'field' (Latin campus), or a habitational name, from a town of the same name in Lugo, Galicia.

Geographical distribution
As of 2014, 25.2% of all known bearers of the surname Ocampo were residents of the Philippines (frequency 1:1,207), 21.9% of Mexico (1:1,697), 21.9% of Colombia (1:653), 10.6% of Argentina (1:1,204), 5.7% of the United States (1:18,945), 2.0% of Paraguay (1:1,079), 1.8% of Peru (1:5,388), 1.7% of Ecuador (1:2,862), 1.6% of Nicaragua (1:1,150), 1.2% of Honduras (1:2,217), 1.1% of Bolivia (1:2,818), 1.1% of Costa Rica (1:1,334) and 1.0% in Spain (1:14,442).

In Spain, the frequency of the surname was higher than national average (1:14,442) in the following autonomous communities:
 1. Galicia (1:3,702)
 2. Community of Madrid (1:9,796)
 3. Canary Islands (1:9,987)
 4. Balearic Islands (1:10,045)
 5. Cantabria (1:13,558)
 6. Asturias (1:14,245)

In Colombia, the frequency of the surname was higher than national average (1:653) in the following departments:
 1. Caldas Department (1:118)
 2. Quindío Department (1:147)
 3. Risaralda Department (1:165)
 4. Antioquia Department (1:286)
 5. Valle del Cauca Department (1:337)

People
Adriana Ocampo (born 1955), American planetary geologist
 Ambeth Ocampo (born 1961), Filipino historian, academic, journalist, and author
 David Samanez Ocampo (1866–1947), President of Peru in 1931
 Francisco Ortiz de Ocampo (1771–1840), Argentine general and politician
 Galo Ocampo (1913–1985), Filipino heraldist and painter
 Hernando R. Ocampo (1911–1978), Filipino painter and national artist
 Jahir Ocampo, Mexican diver
 José Antonio Ocampo (born 1952), Professor at Columbia University and former Minister of Finance of Colombia
 Juan Antonio Ocampo (born 1989), Mexican footballer
 Juan Jesús Posadas Ocampo (1926–1993), Mexican Catholic archbishop and cardinal
 Luis Moreno Ocampo (born 1942), Argentine lawyer and chief prosecutor of the International Criminal Court
 Miles Ocampo (born 1997), Filipina actress
 Melchor Ocampo (1814–1861), Mexican lawyer, scientist and liberal politician
 Mónica Ocampo (born 1987), Mexican footballer
 Octavio Ocampo, Mexican painter and sculptor
 Satur Ocampo (born 1939), Filipino politician, journalist and writer
 Sebastián de Ocampo, 16th-century Spanish explorer of Cuba
 Silvina Ocampo (1903–1993), Argentine poet and writer, sister of Victoria Ocampo
 Victoria Ocampo (1890–1979), Argentine writer and intellectual

See also

 Ocampo (disambiguation)

References

Ocampo